Pádhraic Ó Comáin (fl. 1878) was an Irish scribe.

Ó Comáin was from Pairce O Cuaman, Creig Mhóir, Leacach (Lackagh, County Galway). His scribal work consists of folk songs, poetry, Fianna stories, and poems by Antoine Ó Raifteiri and the brothers Marcus and Peatsaí Ó Callanáin. Some of his work was in turn written in a song-book of Micheál Ó Síoda in 1909.

His son was Mícheál Ó Comáin of Turloughmore.

See also
 Daibhidh Ó Duibhgheannáin
 Mary Bonaventure Browne
 Dubhaltach Mac Fhirbhisigh
 Ruaidhrí Ó Flaithbheartaigh
 Seán Ó Catháin
 Mícheál Ó Ceallaigh

References
 Scríobhaithe Lámhscríbhinní Gaeilge I nGaillimh 1700-1900, William Mahon, in "Galway:History and Society", 1996

Irish scribes
People from County Galway
19th-century Irish writers
Irish-language writers